Wojaczek is a Polish-language gender-neutral surname. The feminine form Wojaczkowa may be the transliteration of the corresponding Czech surname  Vojáčková.

Notable people with this surname include:

Rafał Wojaczek (1945–1971), Polish poet
 (1947–2000), Polish film and theatre actor
, Polish speedway judge of international class
Adi Wojaczek, Polish-German film director

Polish-language surnames